The Parliament Act 1911 (1 & 2 Geo. 5 c. 13) is an Act of the Parliament of the United Kingdom. It is constitutionally important and partly governs the relationship between the House of Commons and the House of Lords, the two Houses of Parliament. The Parliament Act 1949 provides that the Parliament Act 1911 and the Parliament Act 1949 are to be construed together "as one" in their effects and that the two Acts may be cited together as the Parliament Acts 1911 and 1949.

Following the House of Lords' rejection of the 1909 "People's Budget", the House of Commons sought to establish its formal dominance over the House of Lords, which had broken convention in opposing the bill. The budget was eventually passed by the Lords, after the Commons' democratic mandate was confirmed by holding a general election in January 1910. The following Parliament Act, which looked to prevent a recurrence of the budget problems, was also widely opposed in the House of Lords, and cross-party discussion failed, particularly because of the proposed Act's applicability to the passage of an Irish Home Rule Bill. Following a second general election in December, the Act was passed with the assent of the monarch, George V, after the House of Lords conceded due to the Government's threat that the Conservative majority in the Lords could be overcome by creating many new peers.

The Act effectively removed the right of the House of Lords to veto money bills completely, and replaced its right of veto over other public bills with the ability to delay them for a maximum of two years (the Parliament Act 1949 reduced this to one). It also reduced the maximum term of a parliament from seven years (as set by the Septennial Act 1716) to five.

Background

Until the Parliament Act 1911, there was no way to resolve disagreements between the two houses of Parliament except through the creation of additional peers by the monarch. Queen Anne had created twelve Tory peers to vote through the Treaty of Utrecht in 1713. The Reform Act 1832 had been passed when the House of Lords dropped their opposition to it: King William IV had threatened to create eighty new peers by request of the prime minister, Earl Grey. This created an informal convention that the Lords would give way when the public was behind the House of Commons. For example, Irish disestablishment, which had been a major point of contention between the two main parties since the 1830s, was passed by the Lords in 1869 after Queen Victoria intervened and W. E. Gladstone won the 1868 election on the issue. However, in practice, this gave the Lords a right to demand that such public support be present and to decide the timing of a general election.

It was the prevailing wisdom that the House of Lords could not amend money bills, since only the House of Commons had the right to decide upon the resources the monarch could call upon. This did not, however, prevent it from rejecting such bills outright. In 1860, with the repeal of the paper duties, all money bills were consolidated into a single budget. This denied the Lords the ability to reject individual components, and the prospect of voting down the entire budget was seemingly unpalatable. It was only in 1909 that this possibility became a reality. Prior to the Act, the Lords had had rights equal to those of the Commons over legislation but, by convention, did not utilise its right of veto over financial measures.

There had been an overwhelming Conservative-Liberal Unionist majority in the Lords since the Liberal split in 1886. With the Liberal Party attempting to push through significant welfare reforms with considerable popular support, problems seemed certain to arise in the relationship between the houses. Between 1906 and 1909, several important measures were considerably watered down or rejected outright: for example, Augustine Birrell introduced the Education Bill 1906, which was intended to address nonconformist grievances arising from the Education Act 1902, but it was amended by the Lords to such an extent that it effectively became a different bill, whereupon the Commons dropped it. This led to a resolution in the House of Commons on 26 June 1907, put forward by Liberal Prime Minister Henry Campbell-Bannerman, declaring that the Lords' power ought to be curtailed. In 1909, hoping to force an election, the Lords rejected the financial bill based on the government budget (the "People's Budget") put forward by David Lloyd George, by 350 votes to 75. This action, according to the Commons, was "a breach of the constitution and a usurpation of the rights of the Commons". The Lords suggested that the Commons demonstrate at the polls the veracity of its claim that the bill represented the will of the people. The Liberal government sought to do so through the January 1910 general election. Liberal representation in the House of Commons fell steeply, but the party retained a majority with the help of a significant number of Irish Parliamentary Party (IPP) and Labour MPs. The IPP saw the continued power of the Lords as detrimental to the prospect of securing Irish Home Rule. Following the election, the Lords relented on the budget (which had been reintroduced by the government), and it passed the Lords on 28 April, a day after the Commons vote.

Passage

The Lords was now faced with the prospect of a Parliament Act, which had considerable support from the Irish Nationalists. A series of meetings between the Liberal government and Unionist opposition members was agreed. Twenty-one such meetings were held between 16 June and 10 November. The discussions considered a wide range of proposals, with initial agreement on finance bills and on a joint sitting of the Commons and the Lords as a means by which to enforce Commons superiority in controversial areas; the number of members of the Lords present would be limited so that a Liberal majority of fifty or more in the House of Commons could overrule the Lords. However, the issue of home rule for Ireland was the main contention, with Unionists looking to exempt such a law from the Parliament Act procedure by means of a general exception for "constitutional" or "structural" bills. The Liberals supported an exception for bills relating to the monarchy and Protestant succession, but not home rule. On 10 November, the discussions were declared to have failed.

The government threatened another dissolution if the Parliament Act were not passed, and followed through on their threat when opposition in the Lords did not diminish. The December 1910 general election produced little change from January. The second dissolution of Parliament now seems to have been contrary to the wishes of Edward VII. Edward had died in May 1910 while the crisis was still in progress. His successor, George V, was asked if he would be prepared to create sufficient peers, which he would only do if the matter arose. This would have meant creating over 400 new Liberal peers. The King, however, demanded that the bill would have to be rejected at least once by the Lords before his intervention. Two amendments made by the Lords were rejected by the Commons, and opposition to the bill showed little sign of reducing. This led H. H. Asquith to declare the King's intention to overcome the majority in the House of Lords by creating sufficient new peers. The bill was finally passed in the Lords by 131 votes to 114 votes, a majority of 17. This reflected a large number of abstentions.

Provisions
At the request of prominent Cabinet member Sir Edward Grey, the preamble included the words "it is intended to substitute for the House of Lords as it at present exists a Second Chamber constituted on a popular instead of hereditary basis, but such substitution cannot be immediately brought into operation". The long title of the Act was "An Act to make provision with respect to the powers of the House of Lords in relation to those of the House of Commons, and to limit the duration of Parliament." Section 8 defined the short title as the "Parliament Act 1911".

The bill was also an attempt to place the relationship between the House of Commons and House of Lords on a new footing. As well as the direct issue of money Bills, it set new conventions about how the power the Lords continued to hold would be used. It did not change the composition of the Lords, however.

The Lords would only be able to delay money bills for one month, effectively ending their ability to do so. These were defined as any public bill which contained only provisions dealing with the imposition, repeal, remission, alteration, or regulation of taxation; the imposition for the payment of debt or other financial purposes of charges on the Consolidated Fund, or on money provided by Parliament, or the variation or repeal of any such charges; supply; the appropriation, receipt, custody, issue or audit of accounts of public money; and the raising or guarantee of any loan or the repayment thereof. But it did not cover any sort of local taxes or similar measures. Some Finance Bills have not fallen within this criterion; Consolidated Fund and Appropriation Bills have. The Speaker of the House of Commons would have to certify that a bill was a money bill, endorsing it with a Speaker's certificate. The Local Government Finance Act 1988, which introduced the Community Charge ("Poll Tax"), was not certified as a Money Bill and was therefore considered by the Lords. Whilst Finance Bills are not considered money bills, convention dictates that those parts of a Finance Bill dealing with taxation or expenditure (which, if in an Act alone, would constitute a money bill) are not questioned.

Other public bills could no longer be vetoed; instead, they could be delayed for up to two years. This two-year period meant that legislation introduced in the fourth or fifth years of a parliament could be delayed until after the next election, which could prove an effective measure to prevent it being passed. Specifically, two years had to elapse between the second reading in the House of Commons in the first session and the passing of the bill in the House of Commons in the third session. The Speaker also has to certify that the conditions of the bill have been complied with. There are significant restrictions on amendments to ensure that it is the same bill that has been rejected twice. The 1911 Act made clear that the life of a parliament could not be extended without the consent of the Lords.

Parliament had been limited to a maximum of seven years under the Septennial Act 1716, but the Parliament Act 1911 amended the Septennial Act to limit Parliament to five years, reckoned from the first meeting of Parliament after the election. In practice, no election was absolutely forced by that limitation; until the Septennial Act was repealed by the Fixed-term Parliaments Act 2011, all parliaments were dissolved by the Monarch under the Royal Prerogative on request of the Prime Minister. The five-year maximum duration in the amended Septennial Act referred to the lifetime of the Parliament, and not to the interval between general elections. For example, the 2010 general election was held five years and one day after the 2005 general election; the 1992 general election was held on 9 April 1992 and the next general election was not held until 1 May 1997. The reduction in the maximum length of a Parliament was seen as a counterbalance to the new powers granted to the Commons. The Fixed-term Parliaments Act 2011, in contrast, called for general elections every five years (unless called sooner, as in 2017), and provided for an earlier dissolution of Parliament only by certain specified legal procedures. The Act was repealed in 2022, restoring the previous system of dissolution under the Royal Prerogative.

Result
The Lords continued to suggest amendments to money bills over which it had no right of veto; and in several instances these were accepted by the Commons. These included the China Indemnity Bill 1925 and the Inshore Fishing Industry Bill 1947. The use of the Lords' now temporary veto remains a powerful check on legislation.

It was used in relation to the Government of Ireland Act 1914, which had been under the threat of a Lords veto, now removed. Ulster Protestants had been firmly against the passing of the bill. However, the Government of Ireland Act 1914 never came into force because of the outbreak of the First World War. Amendments to the Parliament Act 1911 were made to prolong the life of the 1910 parliament following the outbreak of the First World War, and also that of the 1935 parliament due to the Second World War. These made special exemptions to the requirement to hold a general election every five years.

Legislation passed without the consent of the Lords, under the provisions of the Parliament Act, is still considered primary legislation, ie. a fully valid Act of Parliament. The importance of this was highlighted in Jackson v Attorney General, in which the lawfulness of the Parliament Act 1949 was questioned. The challenge asserted that the 1911 Parliament Act had delegated power from Parliament as a whole to the Commons, and that the 1949 Parliament Act was therefore delegated rather than primary legislation. If this were the case, then the House of Commons could not further increase its own powers through the 1949 Parliament Act without direct permission from the House of Lords. Since it was passed under the 1911 Act, the 1949 Act had never received the required consent of the Lords. However, the Judicial Committee of the House of Lords found that the 1911 Act was not primarily about empowering the Commons, but rather had the purpose of restricting the ability of the Lords to reject legislation, ie. altering the process by which Parliament as a whole enacts legislation. The 1949 Act had therefore been lawfully enacted. This ruling also appears to mean that efforts to abolish the House of Lords (a major constitutional change) by using the Act could be successful, although the issue was not directly addressed in the ruling.

Analysis
The Parliament Act 1911 can be seen in the context of the British constitution: rather than creating a written constitution, Parliament chose instead to legislate through the usual channels in response to the crisis. This was a pragmatic response, which avoided the further problems of codifying unwritten rules and reconstructing the entire government. It is commonly considered a statute of "constitutional importance", which gives it informal priority in Parliament and in the courts with regard to whether later legislation can change it and the process by which this may happen.

It is also mentioned in discussion of constitutional convention. While it replaced conventions regarding the role of the House of Lords, it also relies on several others. Section 1(1) only makes sense if money bills do not arise in the House of Lords, and the provisions in section 2(1) only if proceedings on a public bill are completed in a single session, otherwise they must fail and be put through procedure again.

See also
 List of Acts of the Parliament of the United Kingdom enacted without the House of Lords' consent

References

Case law

Citations

Bibliography

McKechnie, William Sharp, 1909: The Reform of the House of Lords

Further reading
 Blewett, Neal. "The franchise in the United Kingdom 1885–1918". Past & Present 32 (1965): 27–56. online
 Somervell, D.C. (1936). The Reign of King George V. pp. 17–28. online free

External links

Text of the Act as originally enacted

Image of the Act on the Parliamentary website

Constitutional laws of the United Kingdom
Parliament of the United Kingdom
United Kingdom Acts of Parliament 1911
August 1911 events
Acts of the Parliament of the United Kingdom concerning the House of Lords
Acts of the Parliament of the United Kingdom concerning the House of Commons
George V
H. H. Asquith